Usman Sarafa (born March 26, 1985 in Offa) is a Nigerian football player currently with Sunshine Stars F.C.

Career 
An indigene of Offa in Offa local government area of Kwara State, started his football career with Sunshine Stars F.C. of Akure (2000/2001 & 2003/2004), Sharks F.C. of Port Harcourt (2001/2002). In the 2004/5 season's first round of the League, he played for Sunshine Stars F.C. of Port Harcourt, before joined Kwara United F.C. of Ilorin for the second round of the season via the transfer window. In summer 2010 left Kwara United F.C. of Ilorin and signed with Sunshine Stars F.C.

References

1985 births
Living people
Nigerian footballers
Kwara United F.C. players
Association football midfielders
Sharks F.C. players
Sunshine Stars F.C. players
Sportspeople from Kwara State